The Doodlebops is a Canadian live action musical-comedy children's television series produced by Cookie Jar Entertainment (now WildBrain) for CBC Television in Canada, although the series aired in the United States on Disney Channel's Playhouse Disney (now known as Disney Junior) from April 11, 2005 to November 17, 2007. The series combines music, choreography, humour, and skits to teach social lessons. It included scenes from a concert in front of preschool audiences being participated actively.

Characters

The members of The Doodlebops consisted of actors Lisa Lennox, Chad McNamara, and Jonathan Wexler wearing costumes and prosthetic cosmetics to portray fictional musical artists. With a predictable storyline, each episode consisted of some troubles which the three main characters had to resolve.

Main
 Deedee Doodle (keyboards, keytar, vocals) (portrayed by Lisa Lennox) is dressed in purple and pink with a pink "bob" haircut and a purple headband. She plays the keytar and the keyboards and is the lead vocalist for numerous songs, including "Different Things", "Tick Tock", "Tap, Tap, Tap", and "When The Lights Go Out".
 Rooney Doodle (guitar, vocals) (portrayed by Chad McNamara) is dressed in blue. He also plays the guitar. Like his outfit, both his hair (in dreadlocks) and ukulele are blue. He has a red beret on his head with his matching shoes. He is an inventor and likes to watch demolition derbies.
 Moe Doodle (drums, vocals) (portrayed by Jonathan Wexler) wears a yellow and orange striped top and orange pants. Like his pants, his hair (in mullet) is also orange. He plays the drums and is known for his loud and messy antics. In the segment called "Don't Pull the Rope" in each episode, he pulls a red velvet rope and water completely drenches him.

Supporting
 Bus Driver Bob (portrayed by John Catucci) drives the Doodlebop bus. He knows how to play the guitar, but is shy about it and only plays for himself. He also has a twin brother named Bus Driver Rob and another off-screen brother named Obear.
 Mazz (portrayed by Kim Roberts) is the Doodlebops' manager during season 1.
 Jazzmin (portrayed by Jackie Richardson) is the manager of the Doodlebops for the final two seasons, replacing another African-Canadian, Mazz. Jazzmin, who can play the harp, aspires to be a stage actress. She can disappear by snapping her fingers.
 Jumping Judy (portrayed by dancer Stacey Bafi-Yeboa (credited as Stacey Martin)) is Mazz's cousin who bounces when she moves.
 Audio Murphy (voiced by Jason Hopley) is a blue dog who acts as the Doodlebops' video producer. He is a puppet. He claims that his middle name is "A Surprise". He loves to knit.
 Mudge (voiced by Rob Stefaniuk) is a purple cat who is often the victim of Deedee's knock-knock jokes. He lives in the vanity.
 Mr. Moosehead (voiced by Rob Stefaniuk) is the head of a moose which hangs on the wall of the Doodlebops' clubhouse. Loosely based on the Banana Vac from The Banana Splits.

Episodes

Series overview

Season 1 (2005)

Season 2 (2006)

Season 3 (2007)

Telecast and home media
Starting its TV airing run in 2005, the series premiered on the CBC in Canada in the Kids' CBC morning program schedule. Cookie Jar classified the Doodlebops as their flagship franchise, following their rebranding from the Montreal-based CINAR.

On April 1, 2005, Cookie Jar pre-sold the US broadcast rights to the series to Disney Channel, and the series would premiere on the Playhouse Disney block on April 11, 2005. After its removal from Disney Channel on January 2, 2009, the series would later re-air on CBS's Cookie Jar TV block from 2011 to 2013, and on This TV's Cookie Jar Toons block around the same time. In 2016, the show returned to Starz.

In foreign countries, the show has been professionally dubbed into Irish and is broadcast as part of the children's afternoon package Cúla 4 on the Irish-language television station TG4 (including the songs).

By January 2007, following its British free-TV pre-sale to GMTV, the series had been already airing and pre-sold to all Playhouse Disney networks in the United Kingdom, Australia, Italy, Latin America, among others. The series was also pre-sold to Nickelodeon in France, and VRAK TV in the French-language Canada.

Between 2006 and 2007, Lionsgate Home Entertainment released four DVD volumes of the show. 

As of 2022, the show is now streaming on Tubi.

Merchandise

Toyrange
In November 2005, Cookie Jar announced Mattel as the worldwide toy license holder for the show.

Cartoon spin-off

Doodlebops Rockin' Road Show!
In 2009, CBC greenlit a Doodlebops animated spin-off series titled Doodlebops Rockin' Road Show! for Cookie Jar. In September 2009, Cookie Jar announced they would co-produce the series with the German Optix Entertainment, and the Argentian Illusion Studios. In Canada, the series premiered on Kids' CBC on February 20, 2010 and CBS's Saturday morning block in the U.S.

The series focused on the Doodlebops going on a worldwide tour with Bus Driver Bob, a small pink dog named Bop-Bop, and a new character: Mail Snail. These were the only characters to appear in this spin-off. Lisa Lennox, Chad McNamara, and Jonathan Wexler voiced and reprised their roles as Deedee, Rooney, and Moe.

In each episode, Mail Snail would deliver the Doodlebops a video disc sent by a live action child in need of help. The child would then be turned into an animated character and sent to the bus to be a "Doodle for a Day".

Concerts

The Doodlebops: Together Forever Tour
A theatrically live show entitled The Doodlebops: Together Forever Tour was developed and toured Canada in early 2009. The show includes musical performances of signature favourites as well as new songs. This incorporates giant screens, original sets, and costumes. This production features a new cast of performers portraying the Doodlebops.

The show was produced by Koba Entertainment, and presented by Paquin Entertainment.

See also
 The Doodlebops discography

References

External links

 

Canadian children's musical groups
2005 Canadian television series debuts
2007 Canadian television series endings
2000s Canadian children's television series
2000s Canadian comedy television series
2000s Canadian music television series
2000s preschool education television series
Canadian children's comedy television series
Canadian children's musical television series
Canadian preschool education television series
Canadian television shows featuring puppetry
Television series by Cookie Jar Entertainment
Television series by DHX Media
Fictional trios
English-language television shows